The R351 is a Regional Route in South Africa. Its south-western origin is the R67 near Seymour. Its north-eastern origin is the R61 east of the N6 towards Cofimvaba.

From the R67, it heads north, through the Katberg Pass to Katberg. It then goes through the Devil's Bellows pass before veering north-east to Sada and Whittlesea. Here the route crosses the R67 again, at a staggered junction. It heads east to the N6 north of Cathcart. It is co-signed with the N6 heading south. At Cathcart the route diverges from the N6, and heads east then north to reach its terminus at the R61.

External links
 Routes Travel Info

References

Regional Routes in the Eastern Cape